No Password Necessary is a 1967 Soviet action film directed by Boris Grigorev.

Plot 
The film takes place in the Far East in 1921. The surviving White Guards, with the help of Japan, make a coup, while the Bolsheviks meanwhile go underground.... Is based in the same title novel of 1966 of Yulian Semyonov.

Cast 
 Nikolay Gubenko as Commander Blyukher
 Mikhail Fyodorov as Pavel Postyshev
 Rodion Nahapetov as Vsevolod Vladimirov
 Vasiliy Lanovoy
 Anastasiya Voznesenskaya as Sashenyka Gavrilina
 Aleksandr Barushnoy
 Eduard Bredun
 Igor Dmitriev
 Valeri Malyshev
 Vladimir Solopov

References

External links 
 

1967 films
1960s Russian-language films
Soviet action films
1960s action films
Stierlitz
Films scored by Tikhon Khrennikov